Bashirlui-ye Sofla (also Romanized as Bashīrlūī-ye Soflá; also known as Bashīrlū-ye Pā’īn and Bashīrlū-ye Soflá) is a village in Ojarud-e Gharbi Rural District, in the Central District of Germi County, Ardabil Province, Iran. At the 2006 census, its population was 38, in 8 families.

References 

Towns and villages in Germi County